Javier Rangel Hernández is a Mexican politician affiliated with the Institutional Revolutionary Party. He served as Deputy of the LV Legislature representing Aguascalientes.

References

Living people
Politicians from Aguascalientes
Members of the Chamber of Deputies (Mexico)
Institutional Revolutionary Party politicians
20th-century Mexican politicians
Year of birth missing (living people)